John Hazlewood SSC (19 May 1924 – 4 September 1998) was the seventh Anglican Bishop of Ballarat from 1975 to 1993.

Life and ministry
Hazlewood was born in London and grew up in New Zealand. He was educated at Nelson College from 1938 to 1942 and then served in the Royal Air Force during World War II.

After the war he studied theology at King's College, Cambridge and trained for the priesthood at Cuddesdon College. He was ordained deacon in 1949 and priest in 1950. He was a curate at St Michael and All Angels, Camberwell (1949-50), followed by two curacies in Australia: Randwick (1950-51) and Dubbo (1951-53). He then returned to London, and to St Michael and All Angels, Camberwell (1953-54), after which he was Vice-Principal of St Francis College, Brisbane and also a lecturer in ecclesiastical history at the University of Queensland. Later he was Dean of St Paul's Cathedral, Rockhampton (1960-68) and then the Dean of Perth before his ordination to the episcopate on 29 September 1975 at St Paul's Cathedral, Melbourne, to serve as Bishop of Ballarat. He retired from that position in 1993.

As Dean of Perth, Hazlewood organised the Rock Mass for Love with rock group Bakery, which was recorded live at St George's Cathedral, Perth, on 21 March 1971.

His nephew, Will Hazlewood, is Bishop of Lewes.

See also

References

1924 births
1998 deaths
People educated at Nelson College
Alumni of King's College, Cambridge
Alumni of Ripon College Cuddesdon
Academic staff of the University of Queensland
Deans of Perth
Anglican bishops of Ballarat
20th-century Anglican bishops in Australia
Royal Air Force personnel of World War II
Bush Brotherhood priests
British emigrants to New Zealand